Cherry Spur is a prominent rock spur that forms the southwest portion of Sculpture Mountain at the southern end of the Monument Nunataks, Victoria Land, Antarctica. The feature was geologically studied by Ohio State University field parties in the 1981–82 and 1982–83 seasons, and named by the Advisory Committee on Antarctic Names after Eric M. Cherry, geologist with those parties who worked on the spur. The spur lies situated on the Pennell Coast, a portion of Antarctica lying between Cape Williams and Cape Adare.

References
 

Ridges of Victoria Land
Pennell Coast